is a Japanese swimmer. She competed in the women's 100 metre backstroke event at the 2016 Summer Olympics. She qualified to represent Japan at the 2020 Summer Olympics.

References

External links
 

2001 births
Living people
Japanese female backstroke swimmers
Japanese female freestyle swimmers
Olympic swimmers of Japan
Swimmers at the 2016 Summer Olympics
Swimmers at the 2020 Summer Olympics
Place of birth missing (living people)
Asian Games medalists in swimming
Asian Games gold medalists for Japan
Asian Games silver medalists for Japan
Asian Games bronze medalists for Japan
Swimmers at the 2018 Asian Games
Medalists at the 2018 Asian Games
21st-century Japanese women